PTXmas is the second extended play and the first Christmas-themed recording by American a cappella group Pentatonix. The album was digitally released on November 12, 2012, and physical versions were available from November 13, 2012. The deluxe edition was released on November 19, 2013 with 2 additional tracks.

The deluxe version of PTXmas was the sixth highest-selling Christmas album of 2013, with 168,000 copies sold during the holiday season. As of October 23, 2015, PTXmas has sold 385,719 copies.

Track listing

Charts

Weekly charts

Year-end charts

Certifications

References

Pentatonix EPs
2012 EPs
2012 Christmas albums
Christmas albums by American artists
A cappella Christmas albums
Madison Gate Records EPs
Christmas EPs